Line Goes Up – The Problem With NFTs is a 2022 video essay written and directed by Canadian YouTuber and video essayist Dan Olson on NFTs, cryptocurrencies, the metaverse, and Web3. The video was published to his YouTube channel Folding Ideas on January 21, 2022.

Contents 
In the video, Olson traces the early history of Web3 through the 2008 Great Recession and the creation and early history of Bitcoin and Ethereum before reviewing concepts, technologies, and economics of cryptocurrency. Olson then goes over the history and technologies behind NFTs while arguing that they mainly exist to get more people into the cryptocurrency industry. Olson then spends the next segment of the video criticizing the current general lack of quality in NFT art and NFT art collections. In the later half of the video Olson goes over the Crypto and NFT community while also going over and criticizing blockchain games, the play to earn gaming business model (focusing on Axie Infinity in particular), and decentralized autonomous organizations. He concludes the video arguing that the core of the upcoming Web3 movement is a "turf war" between the top 5% and 1% and the market is based on the pitch of 'buy in now and you can be the next tech millionaire', calling it similar to pitches from multi-level marketing companies. He expresses a stance that, no matter how bad the current system is, NFTs, cryptocurrencies, and blockchains are the beginning of a worse system intent on making everything have a speculative price.

Production 
In an interview with Vice, Olson stated he followed the rise of Bitcoin hearing claims that it would reach mass adoption, though after using it, he believed that cryptocurrency was not functional and that it is only viable because its price kept on increasing over time. Olson later came to believe that the history of cryptocurrency was a story about the evolution of fraud. He later became skeptical of new developments in crypto technology viewing them as overpromising and this drove feelings of frustration and anger which led to him making the video. Olson stated he started writing the video in April 2021, only to shelve it until the fall of 2021 because of rapid developments during this period, which made his written material quickly obsolete. The video was released in January 2022.

Release and reception 
 the video currently sits at 10 million views with 390 thousand likes. Following the video's release it trended on Twitter. Following the video's popularity, media outlets such as NPR and The Verge interviewed Olson for his expertise on NFTs and cryptocurrency. The Verges Casey Newton noted "few of Olson's criticisms are entirely new, though the collective force of Olson's arguments is substantial." The New York Times calls it "a two-hour exegesis on the flaws with NFTs and crypto."

See also 
 Cryptocurrency bubble
 Big Tech

References

External links 
 
 

2022 YouTube videos
Films about finance
Films about cryptocurrencies
2022 documentary films
Films released on YouTube
Films shot in New York City
Internet documentary films
English-language Canadian films
2020s English-language films